The 1985 Kansas Jayhawks football team represented the University of Kansas in the Big Eight Conference during the 1985 NCAA Division I-A football season. In their third and final season under head coach Mike Gottfried, the Jayhawks compiled a 6–6 record (2–5 against conference opponents), finished in sixth place in the conference, and outscored their opponents by a combined total of 294 to 281. They played their home games at Memorial Stadium in Lawrence, Kansas.

The team's statistical leaders included Mike Norseth with 2,995 passing yards, Lynn Williams with 373 rushing yards, and Richard Estell with 1,109 receiving yards. Sylvester Byrd, Skip Peete, Willie Pless, and Mike Norseth were the team captains.

Schedule

References

Kansas
Kansas Jayhawks football seasons
Kansas Jayhawks football